Lankanectes is a genus of frogs in the family Nyctibatrachidae that is endemic to Sri Lanka. It is the only member of the Nyctibatrachidae to be found outside India and the only member of the subfamily Lankanectinae.

There are two known species in this genus:

 Lankanectes corrugatus (Peters, 1863)
 Lankanectes pera (Senevirathne et al, 2018)

References 

Nyctibatrachidae
Amphibian genera
Endemic fauna of Sri Lanka
Frogs of Sri Lanka